Headspace is the fourth studio album by South African recording artist Ashton Nyte, frontman for the alternative rock band The Awakening.  The album was released under the name Ashton Nyte and The Accused, representing the live line-up of five musicians including Nyte.  A music video for the single "Murder Me" was aired throughout South Africa bringing the album to a widespread audience.

Track listing
 "Unpredictable"
 "My Little Rock 'n Roll"
 "Murder Me"
 "Free"
 "City"
 "Like Jimmy Dean"
 "Play The Part"
 "Violent Complex"
 "Solitude"
 "Sweet Nothing"
 "Headspace"

References

2005 albums